WAFL Women's (WAFLW) is an Australian rules football league based in Perth, Western Australia. The WAFLW is the premier women's football competition in Western Australia, and from 2023 is contested by eight teams owned and operated by clubs in the men's West Australian Football League (WAFL).

The league was established in 2018 by the West Australian Football Commission and West Australian Women's Football League, the latter having been the governing body and league for women's football in the state from 1987 to 2018, and has been run by the WAFC after the WAWFL was dissolved in 2021.

The league runs from February to August, and ran partially concurrently with the AFL Women's (AFLW) until Season 7 of the AFLW. It is also the second primary women's football competition for West Australian footballers underneath the semi-professional national competition, and one of the three elite leagues in women's Australian rules football (the AFLW, SANFLW and WAFLW).

Clubs
Five of the ten WAFL clubs fielded teams in the inaugural 2019 WAFLW season: Claremont, East Fremantle, Peel Thunder, Subiaco and Swan Districts.

South Fremantle joined the league the following year, with West Perth joining the league in 2022.

Neither of the state's two AFL teams (Fremantle and West Coast) field teams in the league: Fremantle was an AFLW foundation club in 2017, while West Coast entered the AFLW in 2019 after playing scratch matches in 2017–2018.

Future expansion

While East Perth will join the league in 2023, it is currently unknown when Perth will join the WAFLW due to the club's ongoing financial and administrative problems.

South Western Football League officials have also called for the WAFLW to admit an SWFL composite team to the league.

Honours

Premiers

 2020: 
 2021: 
 2022:

Dhara Kerr Award

 2020: Danika Pisconeri
 2021: Ella Smith
 2022: Sharon Wong

See also
 AFL Women's
 West Australian Football League

References

External links
 

 
 
Women's Australian rules football leagues in Australia
Australian rules football competitions in Western Australia
2019 establishments in Australia
Sports leagues established in 2019